Bhupinder Singh is an Indian politician. He was elected to the Rajya Sabha in 2014 from Odisha. He is the former Leader of Opposition in the Odisha Legislative Assembly representing from Narla constituency.
He is a member of the Biju Janata Dal (BJD) political party. He had left Congress and joined BJD in March 2014.

Bhupinder Singh was again elected as a member of Legislative assembly in 2019 Odisha State Election from Narla (Odisha Vidhan Sabha constituency). He got 53264 votes which is 31.12% of total votes  while his nearest contestant Aniruddha Padhan got 44244 votes which is 25.85% of total votes.

References

1951 births
Living people
People from Kalahandi district
Members of the Odisha Legislative Assembly
Rajya Sabha members from Odisha
Leaders of the Opposition in Odisha
Indian National Congress politicians from Odisha
Odisha MLAs 2019–2024
Odisha MLAs 1980–1985
Odisha MLAs 1985–1990
Odisha MLAs 1995–2000
Odisha MLAs 2009–2014
Biju Janata Dal politicians